Lake Fields is a townships in Sungai Besi, Kuala Lumpur, Malaysia. This townships was built at the site of the Sungai Besi tin mine lake which was the deepest tin mine lake in Malaysia at that time.

Geography of Kuala Lumpur